Seth Hockett Ellis (January 3, 1830 – June 23, 1904)  was an American politician who served many years on the Ohio Board of Agriculture. Ellis was also interested in co-operative manufacturing of farm implements. Ellis was born on a farm near Martinsville, Clinton County, Ohio. He married Rebecca Jane Tressler, on August 21, 1851, in Warren County, Ohio.

In 1873, he was elected first Master of the Ohio State Grange, of which he was a founder. 

Ellis began his political career as a Republican. After losing a nomination for office in a local Republican convention, Ellis ran as the Prohibition Party nominee for Lt. Governor of Ohio in 1893, US House in 1894, and Ohio Governor in 1895.

Ellis was the leader of the Union Reform Party, which sought to collect all the various reform movements into one national party. The movement was widely ridiculed in the press. He was the party's nominee for Governor of Ohio in 1899 and the party's nominee for President in 1900. In the latter race, 80% of Ellis's votes came from his home state of Ohio.

Ellis served as one of the two presiding officers of the 1903 centennial of Quakers in Waynesville, Ohio.

Ellis died in 1904 when he fell from a cherry tree on his farm in Waynesville.

References

Candidates in the 1900 United States presidential election
1830 births
1904 deaths
People from Waynesville, Ohio
Ohio Republicans
Ohio Prohibitionists
19th-century American politicians
20th-century American politicians
Accidental deaths from falls
Accidental deaths in Ohio
People from Clinton County, Ohio